Picnic Day may refer to:

  Picnic Day (Australian holiday), in Australia's Northern Territory
  Picnic Day (UC Davis), a student-run event at University of California, Davis

See also
 The Picnic, a holiday custom in Poland